The 2011 Conference USA football season was an NCAA football season that was played from September 1, 2011, through January 2012.  Conference USA consists of 12 football members separated into two divisions: East Carolina, Marshall, Memphis, Southern Miss, UAB, and UCF make up the East Division, while Houston, Rice, SMU, Tulane, Tulsa, and UTEP comprise the West Division.

The 2011 football season marked the 17th season of the conference's existence and 16th of football competition; although C-USA was established in 1995, it did not begin football competition until 1996.

Previous season

UCF won the conference championship for the second time, defeating the SMU Mustangs 17–7.

Preseason

Coaching changes
 Bill Blankenship replaced Todd Graham at Tulsa.

Preseason polls
No Conference USA teams were ranked though Houston, Southern Miss and UCF each received votes in the Coaches Poll, and Houston, Southern Miss, Tulsa and UCF received votes in the AP poll.

Coaches 

Tulane head coach Bob Toledo resigned on October 18 after starting the season 2–5 and was replaced for the rest of the season by interim head coach Mark Hutson.

Regular season

Week One

Week Two

Week Three

Week Four

Week Five

Week Six

Week Seven

Week Eight

Week Nine

Week Ten

Week Eleven

Week Twelve

Week Thirteen

Week Fourteen- C-USA Championship Game

Players of the week

Rankings

Records against other conferences

Bowl games

Bowl Eligibility

Bowl Eligible (5)
Houston (12–1) became bowl eligible on October 8 after defeating East Carolina.
Southern Miss (11–2) became bowl eligible on October 22 after defeating SMU.
Tulsa (8–4) became bowl eligible on November 3 after defeating UCF.
SMU (7–5) became bowl eligible on November 5 after defeating Tulane.
Marshall (6–6) became bowl eligible on November 26 after defeating East Carolina

Bowl Ineligible (7)
UAB (3–9) lost the ability to become bowl eligible on October 29 after losing to Marshall.
Tulane (2–10) lost the ability to become bowl eligible on October 29 after losing to East Carolina.
Memphis (2–10) lost the ability to become bowl eligible on October 29 after losing to UCF.
Rice (4–8) lost the ability to become bowl eligible on November 13 after losing to Northwestern.
UCF (5–7) lost the ability to become bowl eligible on November 19 after losing to East Carolina.
UTEP (5–7) lost the ability to become bowl eligible on November 25 after losing to UCF.
East Carolina (5–7) lost the ability to become bowl eligible on November 26 after losing to Marshall.

Attendance

References